The Salehiye School (Persian: مدرسه صالحیه) is a historical building in Qazvin, Iran. Built in the first half of the 19th century by Mohammad Saleh Baraghani, it managed to become one of the most important Shia religious schools in Qajar Iran, having more than 700 students, it trained many notable figures such as Jamal ad-Din Asadabadi and Seyed Ashrafedin Hosseini.

Gallery

References 

Buildings of the Qajar period
19th-century establishments in Iran
Qazvin